Libert may refer to:

Given name 
 Lietbertus (1010–1076), bishop of Cambrai from 1051 to 1076
 Libert of Saint-Trond (died 783), Belgian saint
 Libert H. Boeynaems (1857–1926), Belgian-born apostolic vicar of the Hawaiian Islands
 Libert Froidmont (1587–1653), Liégeois theologian and scientist

Surname 
 David Libert (born 1943), American music executive and musician
 Georg Emil Libert (1820–1908), Danish painter
 Jarno Libert (born 1997), Belgian footballer
 Marie-Anne Libert (1782–1865), Belgian botanist and mycologist
 Reginaldus Libert, French composer
 Vincent Libert, Belgian sports shooter

Other uses 
 Libertarianism
 Libertarian Party (disambiguation)

See also
 Liberté (disambiguation)
 Liberty (disambiguation)
 Liebert (disambiguation)